The plank (also called a front hold, hover, or abdominal bridge) is an isometric core strength exercise that involves maintaining a position similar to a push-up for the maximum possible time  .

Form 

The most common plank is the forearm plank which is held in a push-up-like position, with the body's weight borne on forearms, elbows, and toes.  Many variations exist such as the side plank and the reverse plank. The plank is commonly practiced in Pilates and yoga, and by those training for boxing and other sports.

The "extended plank" adds substantial difficulty to the standard plank exercise. To perform the extended plank, a person begins in the push-up position and then extends the arms or hands as far forward as possible.

Effect 

The plank strengthens the abdominals, back and shoulders. Muscles involved in the front plank include:
 Primary muscles: erector spinae, rectus abdominis (abs), and transverse abdominis.
 Secondary muscles (synergists/segmental stabilizers): trapezius (traps), rhomboids, rotator cuff, the anterior, medial, and posterior deltoid muscles (delts), pectorals (pecs), serratus anterior, gluteus maximus (glutes), quadriceps (quads), and gastrocnemius.

Muscles involved in the side plank include:
 Primary: transversus abdominis muscle, gluteus medius and gluteus minimus muscles (abductors), the adductor muscles of the hip, and the external and internal obliques.
 Secondary: gluteus maximus (glutes), quadriceps (quads), and hamstrings.

World records 

Guinness World Records lists the record for longest duration of a front plank, resting on elbows, as 9 hours, 30 minutes 1 second set by Daniel Scali. The former record of 8 hours 15 minutes and 15 seconds, was set by veteran Marine officer George Hood on February 20, 2020.  Hood also completed a record attempt in June 2018, holding a plank for 10 hours, 10 minutes and 10 seconds as well as the most cumulative plank time in a 24-hour period of 18 hours, 10 minutes and 10 seconds.

The longest time in an elbow plank:
by a woman is 4 hours, 19 minutes and 55 seconds by Dana Glowacka (Canada) in May 2019.
by a woman with a 60-lb pack is 17 min and 26 sec by  Eva Bulzomi (USA) in July 2013.
with a 100-lb pack is  17 min 02 sec by Silehm Boussehaba (France) in December 2018.
with a 200-lb pack is 4 min 2 sec by Silehm Boussehaba (France) in March 2018.

The longest single-arm plank while balancing on medicine balls is 1 min 20 seconds, by Brandon Westover (USA) in August 2021.

Gallery

See also 
 Chaturanga Dandasana – yoga low plank
 Crunch (exercise)
 Planche (exercise)
 Sit-up 
 Vasishtasana – yoga side plank

References

External links 

 

Bodyweight exercises
Reclining asanas